Central Valley High School is the name of several high schools:

 Central Valley Christian High School Visalia, California
 Central Valley High School (Ceres, California), Ceres, California
 Central Valley High School (Shasta Lake, California), Shasta Lake, California
 Central Valley High School (North Dakota), Buxton, a high school in North Dakota
 Central Valley High School (Pennsylvania), Monaca, Pennsylvania
 Central Valley High School (Washington), Spokane Valley, Washington